After the movie A League of Their Own, a fictional movie based on the All-American Girls Professional Baseball League, several women's baseball leagues were attempted, including Ladies League Baseball, which began play in 1997. The first five teams in the league were the San Jose Spitfire, San Francisco Bay Sox, Long Beach Aces, Phoenix Peppers and Los Angeles Legends.

1997 Season
In the 1997 season, the league consisted of five teams: the San Jose Spitfire, San Francisco Bay Sox, Long Beach Aces, Phoenix Peppers and Los Angeles Legends. In the league's championship the San Jose Spitfires defeated the Los Angeles Legends. Janelle T. Frese of the Los Angeles Legends won the Ladies League Baseball "Most Outstanding Pitcher" award for the 1997 season.

In 1997 the Long Beach Aces played at Blair Field in Long Beach, California, the home of the Long Beach State University baseball program. They were coached by Don Barbara, former professional player and assistant coach at Sacramento State. Barbara played at Long Beach State and was a Dirtbag assistant coach, later becoming the head recruiter and hitting coach at Sacramento State.

The Aces were also coached by Joe Magno, who assumed the role of Aces bench coach.  Magno was a scout with the Cincinnati Reds and later became a minor league bench coach for the Western Baseball League champion Long Beach Breakers in 2001. Magno's coaching career started as an assistant coach at Eckerd College in St. Petersburg, Florida, and continued at Long Beach State, where he ran the Dirtbags showcase camps from 1995 to 1997. Magno later coached high school baseball at Mayfair High School in Lakewood, California.

The Aces had a difficult time filling the stands at Blair Field and were forced to disband after the inaugural season.

Expansion
In 1998, the league expanded and changed its name to the Ladies Professional Baseball League. The league expanded eastward by adding teams in Buffalo, New York, and Augusta, New Jersey, and moving the Los Angeles Legends to Homestead, Florida. The newly expanded league planned a 56-game schedule starting in July and ending in September.

Cancellation
The Ladies Professional Baseball League canceled its second season after only 12 games were played. Michael Ribant, league president and founder, blamed low fan turnout. The average attendance was less than 500 per game. The projected losses for the 1998 season became too great, and the league folded.

Teams

References

Sports leagues disestablished in 1998
Sports leagues established in 1997
Women's baseball leagues in the United States
Defunct baseball leagues in the United States
1997 establishments in the United States
1998 disestablishments in the United States
Baseball leagues in California
Baseball leagues in Arizona
Women's sports in California
Women's sports in Arizona
Defunct women's baseball leagues